Peter's Pence is a 1974 novel by the Australian author Jon Cleary about an IRA plot to steal treasure from the Vatican with the help of an Irish-American journalist. They kidnap the Pope instead.

The book won the Best Novel award at the 1975 Edgar Awards.

References

External links
Peter's Pence at AustLit (subscription only)

1974 Australian novels
Novels set in Rome
Novels about journalists
William Collins, Sons books
William Morrow and Company books
Novels by Jon Cleary